Hot Shots! is a 1991 American comedy film directed by Jim Abrahams, co-writer and co-director of Airplane!, and written by Abrahams and Pat Proft. It stars Charlie Sheen, Cary Elwes, Valeria Golino, Lloyd Bridges, Jon Cryer, Kevin Dunn, Kristy Swanson, and Bill Irwin.  The film is primarily a parody of Top Gun, with some scenes spoofing other popular films, including 9½ Weeks, The Fabulous Baker Boys, Dances with Wolves, Marathon Man, Rocky, Superman, and Gone with the Wind.

A sequel, Hot Shots! Part Deux, was released in 1993, with Sheen, Golino, and Bridges reprising their roles.

Plot 
The film begins at Flemner Air Base 20 years in the past. A pilot named Leland "Buzz" Harley loses control of his plane and ejects, leaving his co-pilot Dominic "Mailman" Farnham to crash. Although Mailman survives, he is mistaken for a deer owing to the branches stuck to his helmet and is shot by a hunter.

Topper Harley wakes up from a nightmare he is having about the event when Lt. Commander Block asks him to return to active duty as a pilot in the U.S. Navy, to help on a new top secret mission: Operation Sleepy Weasel, commanded by the senile and accident-prone Admiral Benson. Harley experiences intense psychological problems, especially when his father is mentioned. His therapist, Ramada, tries to stop Topper from flying, but she relents, and also starts to fall in love with him. Meanwhile, Topper gets into a feud with another fighter pilot, Kent Gregory, Mailman's son and a former boyfriend of Ramada, who blames Buzz Harley for his father's death and believes Topper is dangerous.

Block starts privately meeting with an airplane tycoon, Mr. Wilson, who has recently built a new "Super Fighter" that will make the American pilots superior. Block reveals that he brought back Topper for the reason of making Sleepy Weasel fail. Block would then report that it was the Navy's planes that were the real reason for the mission failure and that they need to be replaced with Wilson's planes. During one of the last training missions, an accident between Pete "Dead Meat" Thompson and Jim "Wash-Out" Pfaffenbach leaves Dead Meat killed and Wash Out demoted to radar operator. Block believes this is enough to convince the Navy to buy new fighters, but Wilson calls it a "minor incident", saying the planes need to fail in combat.

Topper develops a strong emotional attachment to Ramada, but she is haunted by her past with Gregory. On the carrier S.S. Essess, Benson reveals the mission to be an attack of an Iraqi nuclear plant and Block assigns Topper to lead the mission, much to Gregory's protest. Wilson, who is also on board, instructs a crew member to sabotage the planes, putting the pilots' lives at risk. In the midst of the mission, Block mentions Buzz Harley to Topper, who has a panic attack and is unable to lead. Block just starts to call out for the mission to be aborted when Iraqi fighters attack the squadron. All the planes' weapons fail, and Block, realizing what has happened, tells Topper that he saw what really happened with Buzz and Mailman: That Buzz tried to do everything possible to save Mailman, but ended up falling out of the plane, failing in his attempts.

With his self-confidence restored, Topper single-handedly beats the Iraqi fighters and bombs the nuclear plant, dropping a bomb directly on Saddam Hussein. Back aboard the ship, Wilson's plan is revealed, and his standing with the military is lost. Back in port, Gregory hails Topper as a great pilot and gives his blessing to Ramada to be with Topper. The end credits show Dead Meat and Mailman in spirit with Dead Meat saluting and Mailman giving a thumbs up with Elvis Presley (who was mentioned earlier in the film).

Cast

 Charlie Sheen as LT Sean "Topper" Harley
 Cary Elwes as LT Kent "Pirate" Gregory
 Valeria Golino as Ramada Thompson
 Lloyd Bridges as RADM Thomas "Tug" Benson
 Kevin Dunn as LCDR James "Eyewitness" Block
 Jon Cryer as LT Jim "Wash Out" Pfaffenbach
 William O'Leary as LTJG Pete "Dead Meat" Thompson
 Kristy Swanson as LTJG Janet "Bio" Kowalski
 Efrem Zimbalist, Jr. as  Mr Wilson
 Bill Irwin as  LCDR Leland "Buzz" Harley
 Ryan Stiles as  LT Dominic "Mailman" Farnham
 Heidi Swedberg as Mary Thompson
 Rino Thunder as Owatonna 'The Old One'
 Charles Barkley as himself
 Don Lake as Roy
 Cylk Cozart as Drill Sergeant
 Bill Laimbeer as himself
 Jerry Haleva as Saddam Hussein
 Gene Greytak as Pope John Paul II
 Mark Arnott as Rosener

Production
Principal photography was filmed throughout California in locations such as Hollywood Forever Cemetery and San Diego.

Critical reception
The film debuted at number one in the United States, and grossed $180 million worldwide.

The film holds an 81% approval rating at Rotten Tomatoes based on 27 reviews. The site's consensus reads, "Hot Shots! hits most of its parodic targets with aplomb, excelling as a daffy good time thanks to inspired gags and Charlie Sheen's crack comedic timing". Audiences polled by CinemaScore gave the film an average grade of "B" on an A+ to F scale. The film was chosen for the 1991 Royal Film Performance.

Notes
The Folland Gnat portrayed the fictional carrier-based "Oscar EW-5894 Phallus Tactical Fighter Bomber" flown by US Navy pilots.

References

External links

 
 
 
 

1991 films
American aviation films
American parody films
1990s parody films
Films directed by Jim Abrahams
20th Century Fox films
Films about the United States Army
Films about the United States Navy
Films set in Iraq
Military humor in film
American slapstick comedy films
Films scored by Sylvester Levay
Prosthetics in fiction
Films with screenplays by Jim Abrahams
Films with screenplays by Pat Proft
Cultural depictions of Saddam Hussein
1991 comedy films
1990s English-language films
20th Century Studios franchises
1990s American films
Films shot in San Diego
Films shot in Los Angeles